Mehboob Ullah Jan is a Pakistani politician. He was a member of the National Assembly of Pakistan from 2008 to 2013.

Political career
He ran for the seat of the National Assembly of Pakistan from Constituency NA-23 (Kohistan) as a candidate of Pakistan Muslim League (Q) (PML-Q) in 2002 Pakistani general election but was unsuccessful. He received 10,630 votes and lost the seat to Abdul Halim Khan.

He was elected to the National Assembly from Constituency NA-23 (Kohistan) as an independent candidate in 2008 Pakistani general election and later joined Pakistan Peoples Party. He received 14,100 votes and defeated Haji Misar Khan, a candidate of Pakistan Peoples Party (PPP).

He quit PPP and joined Jamiat Ulema-e Islam (F) (JUI-F) before running for the seat of the National Assembly as a candidate of JUI-F from Constituency NA-23 (Kohistan) in the 2013 Pakistani general election. He received 12,337 votes and lost the seat to Sar Zamin Khan.

He quit JUI-F and joined the Pakistan Muslim League (Q) (PML(Q)) before running for the seat of the National Assembly as a candidate of the PML(Q) from NA-11 (Kohistan-cum-Lower Kohistan-cum-Kolai Palas Kohistan) in the 2018 Pakistani general election. He received 12,627 votes and lost the seat to Afreen Khan, a candidate of the Muttahida Majlis-e-Amal.

He quit PML(Q) and joined PPP on 28 January 2023.

References

People from Kohistan District
Pakistani MNAs 2008–2013
Living people
Year of birth missing (living people)